The Diocese of Dromore is a Roman Catholic diocese in Northern Ireland. It is one of eight suffragan dioceses which are subject to the Metropolitan Archdiocese of Armagh.

The diocese has lacked an ordinary since 2018. The most recent bishop was John McAreavey.

Geographical remit
The geographical remit of the see includes portions of the counties of Down, Armagh and Antrim which are all situated in Northern Ireland. Large population centres in the diocese include Newry, Banbridge, Craigavon, Lurgan and Warrenpoint. The bishop's seat (cathedra) is in the cathedral church of SS Patrick and Colman, Newry.

History

Foundation

The monastery of Dromore is believed to have been founded in the sixth century by St Colman (called also Mocholmóc), probably the first Abbot of Dromore. The first building was a small wattle and daub church on the northern bank of the River Lagan. The Diocese of Dromore was established through the reorganisation of the Irish Church in the late 12th century, possibly at the synod held in Dublin in 1192 by the papal legate, Múirges Ua hÉnna, Archbishop of Cashel. The diocese coincided with the territory of the Uí Echach Cobo, which later became the baronies of Upper and Lower Iveagh, and the lordship of Newry, County Down.

Post-Reformation
During the 16th century Reformation, the Roman Catholic Church lost control of the old cathedral in Dromore to the Protestant Church of Ireland, which was wholly destroyed during the rebellion of 1641 and rebuilt twenty years later.

In the 19th century, the Church chose the site of a new cathedral at Newry, the largest town of County Down, and a place of significant ecclesiastical importance as the site of an ancient monastery, situated at the head of Carlingford Lough. Work for building of Newry Cathedral begun in 1823 and was completed in 1829  by Dr. Michael Blake (bishop of Dromore 1833–1860) who had been Vicar-General of Dublin and the restorer of the Irish College at Rome. This cathedral was enlarged and beautified by Bishop Henry O'Neill, who succeeded Bishop Thomas MacGivern in 1901.

Under McGivern's predecessor, John Pius Leahy, O.P. (1860–1890), a Dominican priory was founded on the Armagh side of Newry, and a church erected. The Poor Clares, who went to Newry from Harold's Cross, Dublin, in 1830, were for many years the only nuns north of the River Boyne. The Sisters of Mercy founded a convent at Newry in 1855.

Abbey Yard in Newry marks the site of the Cistercian abbey founded in 1144 by St. Bernard's friend, St. Malachy O'Morgair, and endowed in 1157 by Maurice O'Loughlin, High King of Ireland. It is called in the annals Monasterium de Viridi Ligno — a name given to Newry from the yew-tree, said to have been planted there by St. Patrick, the Irish name being Niubar (and sometimes Newrkintragh, "the yew at the head of the strand") which is Latinized Ivorium or Nevoracum, but more commonly as above Viride Lignum.

Allegations of Sexual Abuse

In 2012 the Parish Priest of Donaghmore in the diocese, Fr Terence Rafferty, was convicted of four counts of indecently assaulting a young girl in 2001.  Five other offences were left on the books.  The offences had been reported to the diocese in 2011: the diocese suspended him and promptly informed the relevant authorities.

On 1 March 2018 Bishop John McAreavey resigned as Bishop of Dromore with immediate effect amid controversy concerning his knowledge of, and behaviour towards Fr. Malachy Finegan. McAreavey celebrated Mass alongside him in 2000 despite knowing Finegan to be a paedophile against whom very serious criminal allegations had been made. In 2002, McAreavey celebrated the funeral Mass of Malachy Finegan in Warrenpoint, Co. Down, Northern Ireland.

Pope Francis accepted McAreavey's resignation on 26 March 2018 and Bishop Philip Boyce was appointed Apostolic Administrator.

On 15 April 2019, Pope Francis appointed the Archbishop of Armagh Eamon Martin as Apostolic Administrator of the diocese.

Ordinaries

The following is a list of the bishops since the beginning of the 19th century.
 Edmund Derry (1801–1819)
 Hugh O'Kelly (1820–1825)
 Thomas Kelly (1826–1833)
 Michael Blake (bishop) (1833–1860)
 John Pius Leahy, O.P. (1860–1890)
 Thomas MacGivern (1890–1900)
 Henry O'Neill (1901–1915)
 Edward Mulhern (1916–1943)
 Eugene O'Doherty (1944–1975)
 Francis Gerard Brooks (1976–1999)
 John McAreavey (1999–2018)

See also
Roman Catholicism in Ireland
List of Roman Catholic dioceses in Northern Ireland
Apostolic Nuncio to Ireland

References

 
1192 establishments in Ireland
Roman Catholic dioceses established in the 12th century
Religion in County Antrim
Religion in County Armagh
Religion in County Down
Roman Catholic Ecclesiastical Province of Armagh